Jye Etheridge (born 30 April 1995) is an Australian speedway rider

Career
Etheridge has appeared in the top tier of British Speedway, riding for the Belle Vue Aces in the SGB Premiership. He is a three times rider of the year for Berwick Bandits. In 2021, Etheridge rode for the Belle Vue Aces in the SGB Premiership and the Berwick Bandits in the SGB Championship.

In 2022, he rode for the Belle Vue in the SGB Premiership 2022, where he won a league title. He also rode for Berwick in the SGB Championship 2022. In 2023, he re-signed for Berwick for the SGB Championship 2023.

References 

1995 births
Living people
Australian speedway riders
Belle Vue Aces riders
Berwick Bandits riders
Edinburgh Monarchs riders
Redcar Bears riders